Temnora robertsoni is a moth of the family Sphingidae. It is known from Tanzania and Mozambique.

The length of the forewings is about 23 mm. It is similar to the form of Temnora griseata griseata with the oblique line running from the costa, but immediately distinguishable by the conspicuous dark brown triangular patch.

References

Temnora
Moths described in 1968
Moths of Africa
Insects of Tanzania